For the defunct provincial electoral district, see Brampton (provincial electoral district).

Brampton was a federal electoral district in Ontario, Canada, that was represented in the House of Commons of Canada from 1988 to 1997. This riding was created in 1987, from Brampton—Georgetown riding, and was abolished in 1996, when it was redistributed between Brampton Centre and Brampton West—Mississauga ridings.

It consisted of that part of the City of Brampton lying west of Dixie Road.

History

Incumbent John McDermid was made the Minister of Housing two weeks before the 1988 federal election was called, shortly after negotiating the Canada–United States Free Trade Agreement.

Three weeks after the election was called, Liberals nominated Harbhajan Pandori, a 41-year-old computer analyst for Canadian Tire. He was a resident of Mississauga, and "president of the large Sikh temple." He campaigned against the proposed federal sales tax (the GST) and "supermailboxes" in new subdivisions. NDP candidate John Morris focused on campaigning against free trade.

Members of Parliament

This riding has elected the following Members of Parliament:

Election results

|-
  
|Liberal
|Colleen Beaumier
|align="right"|35,203 

  
|Progressive Conservative
|Susan Fennell
|align="right"|12,134 
 
|New Democratic Party
|John Morris
|align="right"|1,925 
  
|Natural Law
|Maxim Newby
|align="right"|455

See also 

 List of Canadian federal electoral districts
 Past Canadian electoral districts

References

External links 

 Website of the Parliament of Canada

Former federal electoral districts of Ontario
Politics of Brampton